Rinaldo Roggero (21 August 1891 – 7 July 1966) was an Italian footballer who played as a forward. He competed for Italy in the men's football tournament at the 1920 Summer Olympics.

References

External links
 

1891 births
1966 deaths
Italian footballers
Italy international footballers
Olympic footballers of Italy
Footballers at the 1920 Summer Olympics
People from Savona
Association football forwards
Savona F.B.C. players
Footballers from Liguria
Sportspeople from the Province of Savona